Stan Butler (born February 2, 1956) is a Canadian ice hockey coach and general manager. He served as the only head coach and general manager in the Brampton Battalion and North Bay Battalion franchise history from 1998 to 2019. He has spent his entire professional coaching career in junior ice hockey, and on two occasions, Butler has also served as the head coach of the Canada men's national junior ice hockey team.

As of the 2018–19 OHL season, he was the longest tenured head coach in the OHL with one team. Butler is fourth all-time with 1,424 OHL games coached. Butler is fifth on the wins list with 672, and is the second-most among active OHL coaches, behind Dale Hunter of the London Knights. After 22 seasons in the Canadian Hockey League, Butler has 700 wins. In 158 OHL playoffs games, Butler has 68 wins and two appearances in the J. Ross Robertson Cup finals. Butler previously coached the Oshawa Generals and Prince George Cougars, and has served as head coach of the Erie Otters since 2023.

Career
Butler began coaching minor ice hockey in 1985 with Wexford and led his peewee, bantam and midget teams to four City of Toronto and three Ontario provincial championships. In 1989 he was named the Canadian Amateur Hockey Association's coach of the year. Butler subsequently coached for the Wexford Raiders in the Metro Junior A Hockey League for 5 seasons from 1989–90 to 1993–94.

Butler broke into the OHL when hired by the Oshawa Generals. In the 1994–95 OHL season the team had a record of 40-21-5 for 85 points and set a CHL record when 10 players were chosen in the 1995 NHL Entry Draft. After the 1995–96 OHL season the Generals won 30 games and tallied 68 points.

Butler moved to Prince George, British Columbia, to coach the Prince George Cougars for the 1996–97 WHL season. The Cougars made the playoffs for the first time in seven years, losing in the third round of the Western Hockey League playoffs after defeating the first place Portland Winter Hawks and third place Spokane Chiefs in the first two rounds.

Butler returned to the OHL and began his tenure with the Brampton Battalion as an expansion franchise in the 1998–99 OHL season. The Battalion were led in scoring that season by underage 15–year old Jason Spezza, and fellow future NHL player Raffi Torres. The inaugural Battalion season was one of only two seasons Butler's troops failed to make the playoffs.

In the 15 seasons Butler coached in Brampton, the Battalion won four Central division Emms Trophy titles in 2002–03, 2005–06, 2007–08, 2008–09, and one Eastern conference Bobby Orr Trophy title in the 2008–09 OHL season. Butler coached his 1000th game in the OHL on February 10, 2011. Butler was inducted to the Brampton Sports Hall of Fame in 2012.

Butler moved to North Bay with the Battalion for the 2013–14 OHL season and won the Eastern conference Bobby Orr Trophy. Butler earned his 600th victory in the OHL on February 1, 2015, with a 3–2 win against the Niagara IceDogs. Butler earned his 700th victory in the OHL on March 2, 2018, with a 2–1 win against the Mississauga Steelheads.

On December 10, 2019, the team announced that Butler had been reassigned as a special advisor to the team owner. Adam Dennis was named the new general manager, and Ryan Oulahen was named the interim head coach. As of that date, Butler had coached 1,660 games in the Canadian Hockey League, and earned 765 wins. He ranked fourth overall in wins by Ontario Hockey League coaches, behind Brian Kilrea, Bert Templeton and Dale Hunter; and ranked third in games coached behind Kilrea and Templeton. Butler spent 22 consecutive seasons with the Battalion, which was the longest single-team-tenure in OHL history as of 2023.

On, January 26, 2023, Butler was announced as head coach of the Erie Otters, pending immigration to the United States. His first game as coach for the Otters was a 5–1 loss versus the London Knights on February 4, 2023.

National coaching duties
He was named an assistant coach for Canada men's national under-18 ice hockey team that won a gold medal at the 1998 Three Nations Tournament in the Czech Republic, and served as head coach of Canada men's national under-18 ice hockey team that won the gold medal at the 1999 Four Nations tournament in the Czech Republic.

Butler was named an assistant coach to Tom Renney for Canada men's national junior ice hockey team at the 1999 World Junior Ice Hockey Championships in Winnipeg. Canada claimed a silver medal, losing to team Russia in the final. Butler returned to the national stage after a year off, as head coach of the Canadian juniors 2001 World Junior Ice Hockey Championships held in Russia. Canada defeated team Sweden in the bronze medal game, with Battalion member Raffi Torres scoring in overtime. Butler returned for a second consecutive stint as head coach of the juniors for 2002 World Junior Ice Hockey Championships held in the Czech Republic. Butler became only the third person in Canadian Hockey Association history to coach the national junior team in consecutive years since the CHA’s Program of Excellence began in 1982. Canada earned a silver medal after losing 5-4 to Russia in the championship game.
 
Butler returned to international hockey after 13 years, leading the under-18 national team to an eighth straight gold medal at the 2015 Ivan Hlinka Memorial Tournament in the Czech Republic.

Personal life
Butler was born in East York, Ontario. He graduated from Brock University in 1979 with a bachelor's degree in physical education, completed a bachelor's degree in education at the University of Toronto in 1980, and earned his master's degree in education at Brock in 1988.

Butler has two children, Sara and Adam. He cites the desire to have a normal schedule for his children as the reason he never pursued an NHL coaching career.

Coaching record
Canadian Hockey League coaching record

Note: GP = Games played; W = Wins; L = Losses; T = Ties; OTL = Overtime Losses; SL = Shootout Losses; PTS = Points

References

External links
 eliteprospects

1956 births
Living people
Brampton Battalion coaches
Brock University alumni
Canadian ice hockey coaches
Ice hockey people from Toronto
North Bay Battalion coaches
Oshawa Generals coaches
People from East York, Toronto
Prince George Cougars coaches
University of Toronto alumni